Anıl Taşdemir (born 1 January 1988) is a Turkish footballer who plays as a central midfielder for 52 Orduspor.

He previously played for Göztepe, Ankaraspor, Diyarbakırspor, Bugsaşspor, Akhisar Belediyespor and Orduspor, and represented Turkey internationally at levels from under-17 to under-20.

References

External links
 
 

1988 births
People from Söke
Living people
Turkish footballers
Turkey youth international footballers
Association football midfielders
Göztepe S.K. footballers
Ankaraspor footballers
Diyarbakırspor footballers
Samsunspor footballers
Akhisarspor footballers
Orduspor footballers
Trabzonspor footballers
Kayserispor footballers
Adana Demirspor footballers
Denizlispor footballers
Fethiyespor footballers
Balıkesirspor footballers
Süper Lig players
TFF First League players
TFF Second League players
TFF Third League players